Kulpin may refer to:

 Kulpin, Germany
 Kulpin, Serbia